Ian Robert Stonebridge (born 30 August 1981) is an English former professional footballer. He played in the Football League for Plymouth Argyle, Wycombe Wanderers and Torquay United. He represented England at Under–18 level.

Playing career
Stonebridge was born in Lewisham, London and began his career as a trainee with Tottenham Hotspur. He failed to make the grade at White Hart Lane and moved to Plymouth Argyle on a free transfer in July 1999. His league debut came on 7 August 1999 in a 2–1 defeat away to Southend United. In the 2001–02 season he helped Plymouth to the Division Three title and with it promotion to Division Two. After a season of consolidation, Stonebridge then helped Argyle to the Division Two title in 2004, but left at the end of the season to join Wycombe Wanderers after learning that he would not be a regular in the higher division.

He was a regular in his first season with Wycombe, but lost his place in the 2005–06 season, joining Torquay United on loan in November 2005 and scoring on his debut in the FA Cup draw with Harrogate Town. He returned early from his loan spell due to injury. When he returned to fitness, he scored twice in two games and put in some good performances. After missing pre-season through ankle problems, Stonebridge returned to form with a 35-yard winner against Swindon Town in October 2006. Due to a persistent joint injury named reactive arthropathy, Stonebridge announced his premature retirement from professional football in March 2007 at the age of just 25. He made a brief comeback for Cornish Southern League club Truro City in the 2008–09 season, but it now seems like his playing days are over.

International career
Having joined Plymouth Argyle in the summer of 1999, Stonebridge made his debut for England Under–18's against Switzerland, less than a month after making his first-team debut. He went on to be capped three more times during the qualifying rounds of the Under–18 European Championships, scoring two goals.

Coaching
Since retiring from playing, Ian has gained a degree in Applied Sport Science and Coaching at Plymouth Marjon University and an MSc in Sport Coaching at Loughborough University.

Ian is now a lecturer in Sports Coaching at Plymouth Marjon University for courses including BA (Hons) Sport, Coaching and Physical Education and  BA (Hons) Football Development and Coaching, Ian is also a PhD student at Loughborough University.

Honours
Plymouth Argyle
Third Division
 Winner (1): 2001–02

Second Division
 Winner (1): 2003–04

References

External links
 
 Greens on Screen
 Argyle Review

1981 births
Footballers from Lewisham
Living people
Association football forwards
English footballers
Tottenham Hotspur F.C. players
Plymouth Argyle F.C. players
Wycombe Wanderers F.C. players
Torquay United F.C. players
Truro City F.C. players
English Football League players